Matsudaira Yoshikuni may refer to:

Date Yoshikuni, lord of the Sendai Domain, who lived in the 19th century. (Lords of Sendai had the right to use the "Matsudaira" surname)
Matsudaira Yoshikuni (Fukui), lord of the Fukui Domain, who lived in the late 17th century